Guangxi Zhuang may refer to:
Zhuang languages spoken in Guangxi (which include both Northern Tai and Central Tai languages)
Zhuang people in Guangxi

See also
Guangxi, an autonomous region of China for the Zhuang minority
Standard Zhuang language, based on the dialect of Shuangqiao Township, Wuming District, Nanning, Guangxi